Sainte-Marie-d'Attez is a commune in the department of Eure, northern France. The municipality was established on 1 January 2016 by merger of the former communes of Dame-Marie, Saint-Nicolas-d'Attez and Saint-Ouen-d'Attez.

See also 
Communes of the Eure department

References 

Communes of Eure
Populated places established in 2016
2016 establishments in France